A Little Doll is a 1988 Soviet drama film directed by Isaak Fridberg.

Plot 
The film tells about a young gymnast who is seriously injured, as a result of which she decides to leave the sport. But it’s very difficult for her to come to terms with the idea that she is now just like everyone else.

Casting
Svetlana Zasypkina largely plays herself, under a fictional name Tanya Serebryakova, although Fridberg wrote the script without any knowledge about her. Zasypkina was a competitive gymnast, who trained between ages 6 and 16, and then retired due to a severe back injury sustained during competitions around 1988. Incidentally, Svetlana Zasypkina shares her surname with Maria Zasypkina, another Russian competitive gymnast. Maria also retired due to a back injury sustained during competitions, but later in 2001.

Cast 
 Svetlana Zasypkina as Tatyana Serebryakova
 Irina Metlitskaya as Elena Mikhaylovna
 Vladimir Menshov as Vadim Nikolaevich
 Ervand Arzumanyan as Doctor
 Igor Bugatko as Fedor «Khalyava» Khalikov
 Natalya Nazarova as Tatyana's mother
 Irina Petrova	
 Aleksey Polovichev as Aleksandr «Shura Pyatietazhnyy» Pyatnov
 Galina Stakhanova as Valentina Nikolaevna
 Mikhail Usachev as Headmaster

References

External links 
 

1988 films
1980s Russian-language films
Soviet drama films
1988 drama films
Soviet teen films